State Road 190 (SR 190) is a  road connecting SR 85 (Eglin Parkway/Government Ave) with SR 397 (John Sims Parkway).

Major intersections

References

State Roads in Okaloosa County, Florida
190